{{DISPLAYTITLE:C22H28F2O5}}
The molecular formula C22H28F2O5 may refer to:

 Diflorasone, a synthetic glucocorticoid corticosteroid
 Flumetasone, a corticosteroid for topical use

Molecular formulas